Juliana Hall (born 1958) is an American composer of art songs, monodramas, and vocal chamber music. She has been described by the NATS Journal of Singing as "one of our country’s most able and prolific art song composers for almost three decades" and, in discussing her 1989 song cycle Syllables of Velvet, Sentences of Plush, the Journal went on to assert that "Even at this very early stage in her life and career, Hall knew something about crafting music whose beauty could enhance the text at hand without drawing attention away from that text. This is masterful writing in every respect."

Early life 

Juliana Hall was born in Huntington, West Virginia in 1958 and grew up across the river in Chesapeake, Ohio. Her mother was a pianist and began teaching Juliana piano when she was six years of age. She was active in the family church, where she played, sang, and wrote her first composition. Her grandparents provided inspiration too, exposing Juliana to folk music and poetry.

Hall began her professional studies at the Cincinnati College-Conservatory of Music as a piano major (studying with Jeanne Kirstein), but the work she did in a composition for performers class demonstrated her potential as a composer. After Kirstein died, Hall completed the final year of her bachelor's degree at the University of Louisville (where she studied with Lee Luvisi). Upon graduation, she moved to New York City to study piano (with Seymour Lipkin), sing in the choir of Madison Avenue Presbyterian Church, and usher at Carnegie Hall.

After several years in New York, Hall went to graduate school at the Yale School of Music as a piano performance major (studying with Boris Berman), but also began formal composition lessons (with Martin Bresnick, Leon Kirchner, and Frederic Rzewski). At the urging of her composition teachers, she shifted her focus from piano to composition and in 1987 earned her master's degree. She then went to Minneapolis to finish her formal composition studies (with Dominick Argento).

Professional life 

While a student of Argento, Hall received her first commission in 1987 (from the Schubert Club of Saint Paul, Minnesota) for a song cycle – Night Dances – for soprano Dawn Upshaw, who with pianist Margo Garrett, premiered the work in December of that year. After a performance of the cycle at the Library of Congress in 1988, Joseph McLellan of The Washington Post wrote that, "Juliana Hall used every trick in the book – melodic and half-spoken, tonal and nontonal. She did this to enliven the words by Emily Dickinson, Sylvia Plath, Emily Bronte , Edna St. Vincent Millay and Elizabeth Bishop, to deepen the impact of the texts dealing with night and sleep, to explore the implicit emotions in sounds that ranged from a whisper to a scream, with the piano supplying illustrations and comment and engaging in vivid dialogue."

In 1989 Hall was awarded a Guggenheim Fellowship in Music Composition. Since that time Hall has composed works for many singers, among them acclaimed countertenors Brian Asawa and Charles Humphries; mezzo-sopranos Stephanie Blythe and Kitty Whately; sopranos Nadine Benjamin and Molly Fillmore; tenor Anthony Dean Griffey; baritones Richard Lalli, David Malis and Randall Scarlata; and bass baritone Zachary James. She has also composed several chamber works for the vocal duo of Korliss Uecker and Tammy Hensrud known as Feminine Musique.

Hall was awarded the 2017 Sorel Commission from the American art song training program SongFest for a soprano song cycle, When the South Wind Sings. She was later invited to be the 2018 Guest Composer at the Fall Island Vocal Arts Seminar at SUNY Potsdam, and was also invited to be the 2018 Resident Composer at CollabFest at the University of North Texas.

During her professional career, Hall's music has been performed in dozens of countries around the world. In addition to the Library of Congress, other performances have been presented at venues including the 92nd Street Y, Ambassador Auditorium, Blackheath Halls, Corcoran Gallery of Art, the French Library, Herbst Theatre, Morgan Library & Museum, Ordway Theater, St. Paul's Cathedral, Warehouse Waterloo, Weill Recital Hall at Carnegie Hall, and Wigmore Hall. Festival appearances include the Beverley Chamber Music Festival, Bitesize Proms, Buxton International Festival, Carmel Bach Festival, International Lied Festival Zeist, London Festival of American Music, Norfolk Chamber Music Festival, Ojai Music Festival, Oxford Lieder Festival, Rhonefestival für Liedkunst, Salisbury International Arts Festival, Schumannfest Düsseldorf, and Tanglewood Music Center.

Groups performing Hall's music include ÆPEX Contemporary Performance, CHAI Collaborative Ensemble, Duo Emergence, Ensemble for These Times, Fourth Coast Ensemble, Mallarmé Chamber Players, Mirror Visions Ensemble, Prismatic Arts Ensemble, The Song Company, and Voices of Change. Art song organizations, opera companies, and other presenters programming Hall's music include Art Song Colorado, Baltimore Musicales, Boston Art Song Society, Calliope’s Call, Cincinnati Song Initiative, Concerts of the Earth, Contemporary Undercurrent of Song Project, Dame Myra Hess Concert Series, dell’Arte Opera Ensemble, Joy in Singing, Lynx Project, Lyric Fest, MassOpera, Northern Ireland Opera, On Site Opera, Re-Sung, Seattle Art Song Society, Société d’Art Vocal de Montréal, Source Song Festival, Sparks & Wiry Cries, taNDem–Kunst und Kultur, and the Voces8 Foundation.

Hall's works have been broadcast over the BBC and NPR radio networks, classical stations including WFMT (Chicago), WQXR (New York) and WGBH (Boston), and overseas stations including Radio France (Paris), Radio Monalisa (Amsterdam), Radio Horizon (Johannesburg), RTVE Radio C (Madrid), and Radio SRF 2 Kultur (Zürich).  Commercial recordings have been issued on the Albany, Arsis Audio, Blue Griffin, MSR Classical, Navona, Solo Musica, Stone Records, and Vienna Modern Masters labels.

Juliana Hall's art song catalogue was signed by publisher E. C. Schirmer in 2017. One earlier song cycle, Syllables of Velvet, Sentences of Plush, was published by Boosey & Hawkes in 1995.

Vocal works 

 Ahab (2020) – monodrama for baritone or bass baritone and piano on a libretto by Caitlin Vincent 
 And It Came To Pass (2018) – canticle for countertenor and piano on the Nativity Story from the Biblical Gospel of Luke
 A Northeast Storm (2015) – song for soprano and piano on a letter of Emily Dickinson
 A World Turned Upside Down (2016) – 7 songs for soprano and piano on excerpts from The Diary of a Young Girl by Anne Frank
 Bells and Grass (1989) – 5 songs for soprano and oboe on poems by Walter de la Mare
 Blue Violin (2019) – 3 songs for mezzo-soprano and violin on poems by John Gould Fletcher and Amy Lowell
 Bredon Hill (2020) – song for tenor and piano on a poem by A. E. Housman 
 Cameos (2017) – 6 songs for soprano and piano on poems by Molly Fillmore
 Cameos (2018) – 6 songs for mezzo soprano and piano on poems by Molly Fillmore
 Christina's World (2016) – 5 songs for soprano and piano on poems by Christina Rossetti
 Christmas Eve (2013) – song for soprano and organ on the poem by Christina Rossetti
 Death's Echo (1992) – 5 songs for baritone and piano on poems by W. H. Auden
 Dreams in War Time (2003) – 7 songs for mezzo-soprano and piano on poems by Amy Lowell
 Fables for a Prince (1990) – 6 songs for soprano, mezzo-soprano, tenor, baritone, and piano on fables of Jean de La Fontaine
 Godiva (2019) – monodrama for soprano or mezzo-soprano and piano on a libretto by Caitlin Vincent 
 Great Camelot (2016) – 3 songs for tenor and piano on poems by Sameer Dahar
 How Do I Love Thee? (2015) – 5 songs for soprano and piano by Elizabeth Barrett Browning
 I Can No Other Answer Make (2016) – song for tenor and piano on excerpts from Twelfth Night by William Shakespeare
 I Know a River Wide and Deep (2017) – song for soprano and piano on a poem by Amelia Forrester Petersen
 In Closer Bonds of Love to Thee (2017) – song for soprano and piano on a hymn text by Fanny J. Crosby
 In Reverence (1985) – 5 songs for soprano and piano on poems by Emily Dickinson
 In Spring (2016) – 3 songs for unaccompanied solo soprano on poems by E. E. Cummings
 Julie–Jane (2007) – 5 songs for baritone and piano on poems by Thomas Hardy
 Letters from Edna (1993) – 8 songs for mezzo-soprano and piano on letters of Edna St. Vincent Millay
 Love's Pilgrimage (2000) – 5 songs for baritone and piano on sonnets by William Shakespeare
 Lovestars (1989) – 5 songs for soprano, cello, and piano on poems by E. E. Cummings
 Music Like a Curve of Gold (2015) – 2 songs for soprano, mezzo-soprano, and piano on poems by Sara Teasdale
 Night Dances (1987) – 6 songs for soprano and piano on poems by Elizabeth Bishop, Emily Brontë, Emily Dickinson, and Edna St. Vincent Millay
 Nocturne of Remembered Spring (2020) – setting for baritone and piano of the poem by Conrad Aiken 
 Of That So Sweet Imprisonment (2017) – 7 songs for contralto and piano on poems by James Joyce
 O Mistress Mine (2015) – 12 songs for countertenor and piano on texts from plays of William Shakespeare
 One Art (2003) – 4 songs for mezzo-soprano and cello on poems by Elizabeth Bishop
 Paradise (1999) – 7 songs for soprano and piano on poems by Emily Dickinson
 Peace On Earth (2019) – song for soprano and piano on a poem by William Carlos Williams 
 Peacock Pie (1992) – 20 songs for tenor and piano on poems by Walter de la Mare
 Piano Lessons (2018) – 6 songs for tenor and piano on poems by Billy Collins 
 Propriety (1992) – 5 songs for soprano and piano on poems by Marianne Moore
 Roosters (2016) – setting for soprano, mezzo-soprano, and piano of the poem by Elizabeth Bishop
 Seeker of Truth (2006) – 14 songs for soprano, mezzo-soprano, tenor, alto and baritone saxophones (one player), cello, and child pianist on poems by E. E. Cummings
 Sentiment (2020) – monodrama for unaccompanied solo mezzo soprano on texts by Caitlin Vincent
 Sentiment (2017) – monodrama for unaccompanied solo soprano on texts by Caitlin Vincent
 Songs of Enchantment (1989) – 10 songs for soprano or mezzo soprano and piano on poems by Walter de la Mare
 Syllables of Velvet, Sentences of Plush (1989) – 7 songs for soprano and piano on letters of Emily Dickinson
 The Bells (2014) – setting for soprano and piano of the poem by Edgar Allan Poe
 Theme in Yellow (1990) – 6 songs for mezzo-soprano and piano on poems by Amy Lowell, Edna St. Vincent Millay, and Carl Sandburg
 The Holy Sonnets of John Donne (2013) – 9 songs for tenor and piano on sonnets of John Donne
 The Mystic Trumpeter (2021) – setting for tenor and piano of the poem by Walt Whitman
 The New Colossus (2018) – setting for baritone and piano of the poem by Emma Lazarus
 The Poets (2015) – 5 songs for bass and piano on poems by Henry Wadsworth Longfellow
 The Poet's Calendar (1999) – 12 songs for tenor and piano on poems by Henry Wadsworth Longfellow
 The Walrus and the Carpenter (1992) – setting for soprano, oboe, clarinet, and bassoon of the poem by Lewis Carroll
 Thirteen Ways of Looking at a Blackbird (2020) – setting for soprano or mezzo-soprano and alto saxophone of the poem by Wallace Stevens 
 Through the Guarded Gate (2018) – 5 songs for mezzo-soprano and piano on poems by Margaret Widdemer
 To Meet A Flower (2009) – 3 songs for soprano and piano on poems by Emily Dickinson
 Tornado (2019) – song for soprano and piano on a poem by Kathleen Kelly 
 Two Old Crows (2020) – song for soprano and piano on a poem by Vachel Lindsay 
 Upon This Summer's Day (2009) – 3 songs for soprano and piano on poems by Emily Dickinson
 When the South Wind Sings (2017) – 7 songs for soprano and piano on poems by Carl Sandburg
 Winter Windows (1989) – 7 songs for baritone and piano on poems by Walter de la Mare, Henry Wadsworth Longfellow, Edna St. Vincent Millay, and Percy Byssche Shelley
 Woods in Winter (2014) – song for baritone and piano on a poem by Henry Wadsworth Longfellow

Instrumental Works 

 A Certain Tune (2009) – 5 songs for English horn solo, based on poems by Sara Teasdale
 A Certain Tune (2021) – 5 songs for flute solo, based on poems by Sara Teasdale
 Crucifixus (2010) – piece for cello and piano, based on the story of the Passion from the Gospels of Luke, Mark and Matthew
 Ding Dong Bell (2007) – 8 epitaphs for cello solo, based on epitaphs by Walter de la Mare
 Dream of the Rood (2012) – piece for cello and piano, based on an anonymous 7th-century Anglo-Saxon poem
 Evening Sun (2015) – short piece for piano solo
 Orpheus Singing (2010) – 5 songs for alto saxophone and piano, based on sonnets by Rainer Maria Rilke
 Rilke Song (2013) – song for English horn and piano, based on a sonnet by Rainer Maria Rilke
 The Ballad of Barnaby (2010) – ballad for cello solo, based on the poem by W. H. Auden
 The Ballad of Barnaby (2021) – ballad for viola solo, based on the poem by W. H. Auden
 Two-Bit Variations (2010) – variations for piano solo on the theme “Shave and a Haircut, Two Bits!”

Bibliography 

 Alexandre, Ivan A. "Hommage à Brian Asawa, 1966–2016" Remembrance in Diapason Magazine (April 20, 2016; updated on March 9, 2017).
 Bargreen, Melinda. "Bold Beauty lives up to its name." Review on EarRelevant, (September, 2021).
 Barone, Joshua. "How an Opera Can Fit in a Mailbox" Article in The New York Times (November 25, 2020).
 Berg, Gregory. "Bold Beauty: Songs by Juliana Hall." Review in Journal of Singing Volume 78, No. 4, (2022): 545–546.
 _. "Emergence: Emily Dickinson." Review in Journal of Singing Volume 76, No. 5, (2020): 624–625.
 _. "Love’s Signature: Songs for Countertenor and Soprano by Juliana Hall." Review in Journal of Singing Volume 74, No. 2, (2017): 256–258.
 Blackmore, Callum John. "Love for Sail" Review on Parterre Box (August 30, 2021).
 Brezna, Lenena. "An Analysis of Juliana Hall’s NIGHT DANCES (1987)" DMA Dissertation (2016) The University of Memphis (Memphis, TN).
 Buckland, Monica. "Love’s Signature: Songs for Countertenor and Soprano by Juliana Hall" Review in Journal of the IAWM Volume 24, No. 1, (2018): 24–25.
 Burchett, Tabitha. "WHEN THE SOUTH WIND SINGS - A Song Cycle by Juliana Hall" DMA Dissertation (2019) Jacobs School of Music, Indiana University (Bloomington, IN).
 Campbell, Mark. "Opera by Mail" Article in The Dramatist Magazine (March/April 2021).
 Clarke, Colin. "Love’s Signature: Songs for Countertenor and Soprano by Juliana Hall" Review in Fanfare Magazine (May/June 2017).
 _. "Dame Emma Kirkby and Friends beautifully perform a programme of high imagination and distinction" Review in Seen and Heard International (March 24, 2021).
 Cummings, Robert. "Love’s Signature: Songs for Countertenor and Soprano by Juliana Hall" Review on ClassicalNet (2017).
 Douglas, Jenna. "Talking with Composers: Juliana Hall" Interview in Schmopera Magazine (July 3, 2017).
 Eberle, Katherine. "From Words to Music: Three Song Cycles of Juliana Hall" Article in Journal of Singing Volume 71, No. 5, (2013): 573–585.
 _. "Juliana Hall: A Remarkable Art Song Composer" Article in Journal of the IAWM Volume 19, No. 1, (2013): 21–23.
 _. "Juliana Hall’s Three Song Cycles for Mezzo Soprano" Presentation (2013) at the Women Composers Festival of Hartford (Hartford, CT).
 _. "Juliana Hall’s Voice: Song Cycles of Broken Barriers" Presentation (2013) at the Athena Festival: Murray State University (Murray, KY).
 Faires, Robert. "One Ounce Opera’s Second Fresh Squeezed Ounce of Art Song" Review in The Austin Chronicle (November 10, 2017).
 Gelfand, Janelle. "Two musical startups take root in Cincinnati" Review on Cincinnati.com (April 27, 2017).
 Hinkle, Ellen. "Juliana Hall, American Art Song Composer" Interview in Modern Singer Magazine (August 7, 2017).
 Hoch, Matthew; Lister, Linda. "So You Want to Sing Music by Women: A Guide for Performers" Rowman & Littlefield Publishers (2019).
 Hochmiller, Susan. "So You Want to Sing Chamber Music: A Guide for Performers" Rowman & Littlefield Publishers (November 15, 2018).
 Hogan, Hallie Coppedge. "Women of Letters: a Presentation of Art Songs inspired by the Personal Correspondence of Women" DMA Dissertation (2002) The University of Illinois (Urbana, IL).
 _. "Historical Storytelling Through the Musical Interpretation of Personal Letters" Poster Session (2016) at the College Music Society Mid-Atlantic Chapter 2016 Conference: Winthrop University (Rock Hill, SC).
 Hugill, Robert. "From letters by Edna St Vincent Millay and Emily Dickinson to pictures by women artists, composer Juliana Hall's inspirations are highly diverse in this disc of four of her song cycles" Review on Planet Hugill (September, 2021).
 Johnson, Sharon. "Veriditas: Enlivened Creativity in selected works of Judith Zaimont, Libby Larsen and Juliana Hall" DMA Dissertation (2009) University of Minnesota (Minneapolis, MN).
 Mazzaro, Maria. "Molly Fillmore - Bold Beauty: Compositions by Juliana Hall." Review in Opera News (Volume 86, No. 8, February, 2022).
 McLellan, Joseph. "Dawn Upshaw at the Library of Congress" Review in Washington Post (December 12, 1988).
 Newsome, Joseph. "Love’s Signature: Songs for Countertenor and Soprano by Juliana Hall" Review on Voix de Arts (April 24, 2017).
 Panizza, Nicole. "“Making Anne Sing”: Juliana Hall’s ‘A World Turned Upside Down’" Women's Song Forum (2021).
 _. "Reading in The Dark: A Performer’s Encounter With Emily Dickinson and her American Musical Interpreters" DMA Dissertation (2012) Royal College of Music (London, UK).
 _. "Reading in The Dark: A Performer’s Encounter With Emily Dickinson and her American Musical Interpreters" Lecture-Recital (2015) at PERFORMA – Conference in Music Performance Studies: University of Aveiro (Aveiro, PT).
 Parrott, Mackenzie Powell. "Juliana Hall's UPON THIS SUMMER'S DAY" Master's Degree Dissertation (2016) The University of Texas at San Antonio (San Antonio, TX).
 Piazza-Pick, Jennifer. "SEE IT TO BE IT - ART SONGS BY AMERICAN WOMEN" DMA Dissertation (2020) University of Maryland (College Park, MD).
 Reinthaler, Joan. "Contemporary Music Forum at the Corcoran Gallery" Review in Washington Post (March 20, 1995).
 Roland-Silverstein, Kathleen. "Cameos and Ahab, by Juliana Hall" Review in Journal of Singing Volume 78, No. 4, (2022): 539-541.
 _. "Godiva and Sentiment, by Juliana Hall" Review in Journal of Singing Volume 76, No. 5, (2020): 619-620.
 _. "Making Sweet Music Together: Ensemble Singing for Duets, Trios, and Quartets. Fables for a Prince, by Juliana Hall" Review in Journal of Singing Volume 74, No. 1, (2017): 124.
 _. "Night Dances and O Mistress Mine, by Juliana Hall" Review in Journal of Singing Volume 73, No. 3, (2017): 349–350.
 Rosenberg, Donald. "Bold Beauty: Songs by Juliana Hall" Review in Gramophone Magazine (November, 2021).
 _. "Love’s Signature: Songs for Countertenor and Soprano by Juliana Hall" Review in Gramophone Magazine (May, 2017).
 Ruel, Chris. "Off the Beaten Track: Zachary James’ ‘CALL OUT’ – A Wild Trip with a Literary Bent" Review in OperaWire (January 23, 2021).
 Ruhe, Pierre. "Contemporary Music Forum: American Music at the Corcoran Gallery" Review in Washington Post (December 18, 1999).
 Seymour, Claire. "Dame Emma Kirkby and Friends: Abiding Love" Review in Opera Today (March 2021).
 Staring, Laurie. "SELECTED MODERN SETTINGS OF EMILY DICKINSON POETRY BY OSVALDO GOLIJOV, RICKY IAN GORDON, LORI LAITMAN, JAKE HEGGIE, LIBBY LARSEN, ANDRÉ PREVIN, AND JULIANA HALL" DMA Dissertation (2020) Jacobs School of Music, Indiana University (Bloomington, IN).
 Twining, Todd. "Discovering Hidden Figures: A unique history project challenges seventh grade music class students to discover the “hidden figures” of the classical music world." Article in The Kapralova Society Journal Volume 16, Issue 2 (Fall 2018): 17.
 Ward, Marvin. "Mixed Art Media: New Recordings by More Women Composers" Review in Cultural Voice of North Carolina (CVNC) (January 11, 2022).
 Weston, Sue and Rosenbluth, Susie. "Anne Frank’s Diary as a Song Cycle, Part of Beauty That Still Remains" Article in The Jewish Voice and Opinion (February 24, 2021).
 Woolfe, Zachary. "A Brand-New Tradition: Bard College Singers and Composers at the Morgan Library" Review in New York Times (February 22, 2013).

External links 

 Juliana Hall Website
 E. C. Schirmer Website
 Schubert Club Commissions
 John Simon Guggenheim Foundation
 SongFest 2017 Sorel Commission
 Fall Island Vocal Arts Seminar 2018
 CollabFest 2018
  Hampsong Foundation Song of America
  Lieder.NET
  Sparks & Wiry Cries
  Schmopera
  Modern Singer Magazine
  Blackwing Pages

References 

1958 births
Living people
American classical composers
American women classical composers
Yale School of Music alumni
21st-century classical composers
21st-century American composers
20th-century classical composers
20th-century American composers
21st-century American women musicians
20th-century American women musicians
20th-century women composers
21st-century women composers